Fotbal Club Farul Constanța is a professional association football club based in Constanța, Romania. The club was founded in 1949.

Farul Constanța played their first top league fixture on 6 March 1955 against Dinamo București. Since that game they have played in 1299 first league matches and have faced 58 different sides. Their most regular opponents have been Dinamo București, whom they have played against on 84 occasions. The club has won 27 of the league matches against Universitatea Cluj which represents the most Farul have won against any team. They have drawn more matches with Dinamo București than with any other club, with 18 of their meetings finishing without a winner. Dinamo București are also the side that has defeated Farul in more league games than any other club, having won 51 of their encounters.

Key
 The table includes results of matches played by Farul Constanța in Liga I.
   Clubs with this background and symbol in the "Club" column are defunct
 The name used for each opponent is the name they had when Farul Constanța most recently played a league match against them. Results against each opponent include results against that club under any former name. For example, results against Universitatea Cluj include matches played against Știința Cluj.
 P = matches played; W = matches won; D = matches drawn; L = matches lost; F = goals for; A = goals against; Win% = percentage of total matches won
 The columns headed "First" and "Last" contain the first and most recent seasons in which Farul Constanța played league matches against each opponent

All-time league record
Statistics correct as of matches played on season 2016–17.

References

General
 
 

FCV Farul Constanța
Romanian football club league records by opponent